Chassal-Molinges is a commune in the Jura department in Bourgogne-Franche-Comté in eastern France. It was established on 1 January 2019 by merger of the former communes of Molinges (the seat) and Chassal.

See also 
 Communes of the Jura department

References 

Communes of Jura (department)
Populated places established in 2019
2019 establishments in France